The Timpton is a river in Sakha Republic (Yakutia), Russia. It is a right tributary of the Aldan River of the Lena basin. There are no settlements near its banks except for Nagorny village. 

The Timpton is crossed by the A360 Lena Highway and coal is mined in the river basin. Up to the present the Timpton is in a relative pristine condition, being a favorite destination for rafting and kayaking, but construction of the Nizhne-Timpton hydroelectric power station, approved in 2009, is planned on the river course in the future.

Grayling, whitefish, taimen, rudd, perch and lenok are found in the waters of the river.

Course
The Timpton is the fourth tributary of the Aldan regarding length and basin area. Its source is located on the northern slopes of the Stanovoy Range, at the southern limit of Yakutia, near the Amur Oblast border. First it flows in an eastward direction and then it turns and flows in a roughly northward direction along its course. It crosses the foothills of the Aldan Highlands and its valley marks the western limit of the Sunnagyn Range. Its upper course is tortuous, with frequent rapids. There is no floodplain, but the last stretch is navigable. Finally the Timpton joins the right bank of the Aldan  from its mouth.

Its tributaries include the Big Yllymakh, Chulmakan, Chulman and Iyengra. The river is frozen between October and May.

See also
List of rivers of Russia
South Yakutia HPP

References

External links 

 Geography - Yakutia Organized

Rivers of the Sakha Republic
Aldan Highlands